The 2020 2nd Red Bull Ring FIA Formula 3 round was a motor racing event held on 11 and 12 July 2020 at the Red Bull Ring in Austria. It is the second round of the 2020 FIA Formula 3 Championship, and ran in support of the 2020 Styrian Grand Prix.

Classification

Qualifying

Feature Race
The race originally completed 12 laps, however, due to the race being stopped and several incidents occurring prior to the red flag, the race results were counted back to lap 11.

Sprint Race

Notes
  – Roman Staněk was given a 30 second time penalty for a formation lap safety car infraction.

Standings after the event

Drivers' Championship standings

Teams' Championship standings

 Note: Only the top five positions are included for both sets of standings.

See also
2020 Styrian Grand Prix
2020 2nd Red Bull Ring FIA Formula 2 round

References

External links
Official website

|- style="text-align:center"
|width="35%"|Previous race:
|width="30%"|FIA Formula 3 Championship2020 season
|width="40%"|Next race:

Spielberg
Spielberg
Auto races in Austria